Grebo may refer to:
Grebo people, an ethnic group or subgroup within the larger Kru group of West Africa
Grebo language, their language
Grebo languages, a dialect cluster of the Kru languages
Grebo (music), a United Kingdom subculture of the late 1980s and early 1990s
Grebo IK, a football club in Sweden 
Grebo, Sweden, a locality in Östergötland County
Zdravko Grebo (1947–2019), professor of law at the University of Sarajevo

See also
Greb